Sam Kennedy-Warburton, OBE MStJ (born 5 October 1988), commonly known as Sam Warburton, is a Welsh former international rugby union player. Warburton played rugby for Cardiff Rugby and was first capped for Wales in 2009. He usually played as an openside flanker but was also capable of playing at blindside. In June 2011, he was named as Wales captain versus the Barbarians and subsequently in August 2011 he was named as the Wales captain for the 2011 Rugby World Cup. In April 2013, he was named the Lions' captain for the 2013 tour to Australia, and was also named as captain for the 2017 tour to New Zealand. Warburton held the record for the most Wales caps as captain (49) until surpassed by Alun Wyn Jones.

In July 2018, the Wales and British & Irish Lions captain announced his retirement from rugby union at 29 years of age after failing to fully recover from neck and back surgery

Early and personal life
Warburton was born in Wales to a Welsh mother and an English father and he considers himself Welsh and British. He has an older twin brother, Ben, who played at semi-professional level with Glamorgan Wanderers RFC and is now a physiotherapist for the Cardiff Rugby, and an older sister Holly, a schoolteacher. Their great-grandfather, George Reed, was a professional footballer who played 150 times for Leeds United in the 1920s and 1930s. He attended Whitchurch High School and left with three A Levels. As a youngster he was a keen football player and played for his school team alongside schoolmate Real Madrid and Wales forward Gareth Bale. He had a trial with local club Cardiff City at the age of 14 but chose to concentrate on rugby instead. He played on the junior teams of Rhiwbina RFC and played for Glamorgan Wanderers RFC whilst a member of the Cardiff Rugby Academy.

On 5 July 2014, Warburton married long term partner Rachel Thomas in a church ceremony in Newport, before the couple held a reception at the Celtic Manor Resort. He is a supporter of Tottenham Hotspur FC.

Career
Warburton represented Wales at all levels, captaining the under-18s, under-19s and under-20s. He led Wales to the semi-finals of the World Championships at under-19 and under-20 level. Warburton made his debut for the senior Wales national team against the United States on 6 June 2009.

On 18 January 2010, he was named in the 35-man Wales squad for the 2010 Six Nations. He scored his first international try against Italy in the 2011 Six Nations. Warburton captained Wales for the first time against the Barbarians on 4 June 2011 at the age of 22 years and 242 days becoming Wales' second youngest captain after Gareth Edwards. In a World Cup warm-up match against England, Warburton was named man of the match. In August 2011, he was named as captain for the 2011 Rugby World Cup in New Zealand in the absence of the injured Matthew Rees.

2011 Rugby World Cup
In the opening match of the tournament against South Africa, Warburton became the youngest ever World Cup captain, facing experienced South African openside flanker Heinrich Brüssow. While Wales lost 17–16, Warburton won man of the match, forcing six turnovers and making nearly a quarter of Wales' tackles (23 out of 99). He continued his form in the match against Samoa, making a further six turnovers and 17 tackles as Wales won 17–10. Warburton played another good game against Namibia before being rested for the final half-hour in the 81–7 game. Wales then booked their place in the quarter-finals against Ireland with a 66–0 win over Fiji, in direct contrast to the loss of four years earlier. Warburton was again at the heart of the performance making some steals and some good runs, and also scoring his second test try. At the end of this remarkable few weeks, Warburton was then voted the Player of Pool D by the fans; he had taken the tournament by storm, making the highest number of turnovers.

Wales then met Ireland in the quarter-final as Warburton faced the in-form Irish openside flanker Seán O'Brien, in the 'battle of the opensides'. Wales reached the semi-final for the first time in 24 years with a 22–10 win, as Warburton continued his form, making 21 tackles and a number of turnovers, disrupting Ireland's ball. In the semi-final against an out-of-form France, Warburton became the second Wales player to receive a red card in a World Cup when he was sent off after 18 minutes by the Irish referee Alain Rolland for a dangerous tackle on Vincent Clerc. Warburton admitted the offence at a disciplinary hearing in Auckland, and stated to the press that the decision was fair.  However, he stated in his autobiography in 2019 that he actually considered that only a yellow card should have been awarded. Despite the sending off, the Guardian newspaper, Brynmor Williams and Sir Ian McGeechan, the Lions coach, named him player of the tournament.

2012 Six Nations
In spite of the return of former captain Matthew Rees, Warburton retained the Wales captaincy for the 2012 Six Nations. However, the campaign was disrupted by injury. In the opening match against Ireland, Warburton went off injured at half-time with a dead leg, but Wales managed to win 23–21. He missed the 27–13 win over Scotland but returned for the Triple Crown decider against England. Wales won 19–12. Warburton was at his best making steals, carries, taking lineouts, but it was his try-saving tackle on Manu Tuilagi that caught the eye. The England centre seemed destined to score in the corner but Warburton launched himself low and grabbed his ankles to make a superb try-saver. As a result, he was awarded man of the match. However, he sustained a knee injury and missed the 24–3 win over Italy. He returned for the Grand Slam decider against France but was once again injured, this time his shoulder and was taken off at half-time. Wales prevailed though 16–9 to claim a Grand Slam. Warburton would then lift the trophy with one hand, since his other shoulder was in a sling. He later spoke of his guilt at going off at half-time and asked vice-captains Gethin Jenkins and Ryan Jones to share the raising of the trophy, but the veterans said it was his moment. The injury he sustained would rule him out for six weeks, returning in time for the Lions tour of Australia in June 2013.

2015 Six Nations
Warburton surpassed the record of 33 caps as Wales captain held by Ryan Jones against Ireland on 14 March 2015.

British & Irish Lions
Warburton was named as captain of a 37-man squad for the 2013 British & Irish Lions tour to Australia, making him the youngest ever Lions captain at the age of 24. Warburton was selected as captain in the first test in Brisbane, combining in the back row with Tom Croft and Jamie Heaslip. The Lions won 23–21 with Warburton topping the tackle count with 14. Warburton started the second test a week later. The Lions lost 16–15 and many considered the turning point to be when Warburton got injured and left the field. Warburton was magnificent at the breakdown preventing the Wallabies from having a platform. However, the hamstring injury he picked up in the second test meant Warburton was ruled out of the final, deciding test, with Alun Wyn Jones captaining the team to a 41–16 win and the Lions’ first series victory since 1997. After the match, Warburton and Jones raised the Tom Richards Cup together.

In April 2017, Warburton was selected by Warren Gatland to captain the Lions for the 2017 tour to New Zealand.

International tries

Honours

Cardiff Rugby
European Challenge Cup: 2009–10

Wales
Six Nations Championship:
Winner (2): 2012, 2013
Grand Slam Winner (1):2012
Triple Crown Winner (1):2012

He was awarded an Honorary Fellowship by the University of South Wales in 2013.

References

External links

Cardiff Blues Profile 

Cardiff Rugby players
Glamorgan Wanderers RFC players
Living people
Officers of the Order of the British Empire
People educated at Whitchurch High School
Rugby union players from Cardiff
Welsh twins
Wales international rugby union players
Welsh people of English descent
Wales rugby union captains
Rugby union flankers
1988 births
British & Irish Lions rugby union players from Wales
People from Rhiwbina
Twin sportspeople